The Pittsfield Cubs, located in Pittsfield, Massachusetts, were a minor league baseball team that played in the Eastern League from 1985 to 1988. They played their home games at Wahconah Park and were affiliated with the Chicago Cubs.

History

The Cubs were founded in 1985 after an investment group acquired the Double-A franchise rights for $350,000 from the Buffalo Bisons.

On the field, the Cubs were successful, making the playoffs in three of four years.  In 1987, the team finished first during the regular season, although they failed to win the championship.  In addition to Eastern League all-star selections, the team had two Eastern League Most Valuable Players, Rafael Palmeiro in 1986 and Mark Grace in 1987.  The team also had two no-hitters during their existence.  On August 1, 1985, Johnny Abrego threw a no-hitter against the Nashua Pirates winning by a 1-0 score. On July 18, 1988, Kris Roth pitched a no-hitter against the Harrisburg Senators, winning by a 3-0 score.

Off the field, the Cubs were plagued by attendance problems.  They finished last or next to last in Eastern league attendance during each of their four years of existence.

Season-by-season record

Legacy
The Pittsfield Cubs moved to Williamsport, Pennsylvania after the 1988 season, becoming the Williamsport Bills and affiliating with the Seattle Mariners.  The community of Pittsfield gained the Pittsfield Mets for the 1989 season.  The Chicago Cubs transferred their AA level affiliation to the Charlotte Knights.

Future Major League Pittsfield Cubs

Johnny Abrego (1985)
Mike Brumley (1985)
Mike Capel (1985-1986)
Steve Engel (1985)
Darrin Jackson (1985-1986)
Jamie Moyer (1985)
Gary Varsho (1985-1986)
Rich Amaral (1986-1988)
Damon Berryhill (1986)
Drew Hall (1986)
Les Lancaster (1986)
Greg Maddux (1986)
Mike Martin (1986)
Paul Noce (1986)
Rafael Palmeiro (1986)
Rolando Roomes (1986-1987)
Phil Stephenson (1986)
Doug Dascenzo (1987)
Mark Grace (1987)
Dave Pavlas (1987)
Jeff Pico (1987)
Laddie Renfroe (1987-1988)
Rich Scheid (1987-1988)
Dwight Smith (1987)
Héctor Villanueva (1987-1988)
Rick Wrona (1987-1988)
Jim Bullinger (1988)
Joe Girardi (1988)
Mike Harkey (1988)
Joe Kraemer (1988)
Ced Landrum (1988)
Kelly Mann (1988)
Jeff Schwarz (1988)
Jerome Walton (1988)
Dean Wilkins (1988)

Pittsfield Cubs with previous Major League experience
Jeff Cornell (1985)
Steve Hammond (1985)
Jeff Jones (1985)
Dickie Noles (1987)
Al Chambers (1988)

Eastern League All-Stars
First Base:  Phil Stephenson (1986), Mark Grace (1987)
Shortstop:  Mike Brumley (1985), Paul Noce (1986)
Outfield: Rafael Palmeiro (1986), Dwight Smith (1987), Jerome Walton (1988)
Pitcher: Dean Wilkins (1988)

Eastern League Season Leaders

Pitching
Winning Percentage: .813 (13-3), David Masters (1987)  .818 (9-2) Michael Harkey (1988)

Hitting
Batting Average: .331, Jerome Walton (1988)
Runs: 87, Paul Noce (1986)  111, Dwight Smith (1987)  82, Ced Landrum (1988)
Hits: 156, Rafael Palmeiro (1986)
Runs Batted In: 95, Rafael Palmeiro (1986)  101, Mark Grace (1987)

References
Notes

Sources

Encyclopedia of Minor League Baseball: The Official Record of Minor League Baseball – Lloyd Johnson, Miles Wolff. Publisher: Baseball America, 2007. Format: Hardback, 767 pp. 

1985 establishments in Massachusetts
1988 disestablishments in Massachusetts
Baseball teams established in 1985
Baseball teams disestablished in 1988
Chicago Cubs minor league affiliates
Defunct Eastern League (1938–present) teams
Defunct baseball teams in Massachusetts
Baseball teams in Pittsfield, Massachusetts
Professional baseball teams in Massachusetts